Guillaume de Groot (1839–1922) was a Belgian sculptor.

Born in Brussels, he trained with sculptor Égide Mélot.  His work includes:

 figures of Namur and Luxembourg at the arch of the Cinquantenaire in Brussels
 four reclining figures on the window pediments at the Brussels Stock Exchange, for architect Léon Suys, circa 1870
 figure of Music, one of four figures on the piers of the facade, as well as the gilded Genius of Art, atop the Royal Museums of Fine Arts of Belgium for architect Alphonse Balat, circa 1875
 heroic figure of Labor for the Tournai railway station, 1881
 bronze statue of Charles Rogier, Place de la Liberté, 1897

Gallery

References

External links
 

1836 births
1922 deaths
Belgian architectural sculptors
20th-century Belgian sculptors
19th-century Belgian sculptors
19th-century Belgian male artists
20th-century Belgian male artists